This is a list of notable political scientists. See the list of political theorists for those who study political theory. See also political science.

A 
 Robert Abelson - Yale University psychologist and political scientist with special interests in statistics and logic
 Henry J. Abraham - American scholar on the judiciary and constitutional law and James Hart Professor of Government Emeritus at the University of Virginia
 Alan Abramowitz – expert in American politics, political parties, ideological realignment, elections, and voting behavior; professor at Emory University
 Paul R. Abramson - American political scientist known for his research and writing on American, European, and Israeli elections and professor of political science at Michigan State University
As'ad AbuKhalil -  Lebanese-American professor of political science at California State University, Stanislaus.
Ibrahim Abu-Lughod
 Brooke Ackerly - expert on grounded normative theory, feminist theory, feminist international relations, and scholar activism, professor at Vanderbilt University
Martha Ackelsberg -  American political scientist and women's studies scholar at Smith College
 David Adamany – public law specialist and President of Temple University
 Charles R. Adrian - American professor of political science who specialized in municipal politics
 Vinod Aggarwal - American political scientist specializing in international political economy
 Robert Agranoff - American political scientist and public administration scholar and author
 Arun Agrawal - political scientist in the School of Natural Resources & Environment at the University of Michigan
 Janet Ajzenstat - Canadian political historian at McMaster University
Adeolu Akande - professor of political science at the Igbinedion University
Bolaji Akinyemi - Nigerian professor of political science
 Bethany Albertson - American political psychologist
 Daniel P. Aldrich - American political scientist, public policy and Asian studies scholar at Northeastern University
 John Aldrich – political parties expert at Duke University, author of Why Parties?
 John R. Alford - political science professor at Rice University who researches genopolitics
 Hayward Alker - professor of international relations at the University of Southern California, MIT and Yale who specialized in research methods, core international relations theory, international politics, and security
 Danielle Allen - American classicist and political scientist
 Graham Allison - early proponent of the bureaucratic politics model, author of Essence of Decision, national security specialist, former Dean of Harvard Kennedy  School at Harvard University
 Gabriel A. Almond - originator of the culturist movement in comparative politics
 Gar Alperovitz - political economist
 Karen Alter - American academic who conducts interdisciplinary work on international law's influence in international and domestic politics
 Scott Althaus - professor of political science and communication at the University of Illinois at Urbana-Champaign and the director of the Cline Center for Advanced Social Research at the university
 Micah Altman - American social scientist who conducts research in social science informatics
 R. Michael Alvarez - professor of political science at California Institute of Technology and co-director of the Voting Technology Project
 Tabata Amaral - Brazilian political scientist and federal deputy for São Paulo
 Ambedkar - jurist, economist and Chairman of the Drafting Committee of the Constitution of India
 Thomas Ambrosio - professor of political science in the Criminal Justice and Political Science Department at North Dakota State University
 Kristi Andersen - American political scientist at Syracuse University who studies party realignment
 Walter K. Andersen - American academic known for his studies of the Hindu nationalist organization Rashtriya Swayamsevak Sangh
 Benedict Anderson - Chinese-born Irish political scientist and historian in the US, author of Imagined Communities
 Lisa Anderson - American political scientist and the former President of the American University in Cairo
 Walter Truett Anderson - American political scientist, social psychologist, and author of non-fiction books and articles
 William Anderson - specialist in public administration
 Mina Andreeva - Bulgarian political scientist and chief spokesperson for the European Commission
 Marimba Ani - anthropologist and African Studies scholar best known for her work Yurugu
 Stephen Ansolabehere - professor of government at Harvard University
 William Antholis - Greek-American political scientist, director and CEO of the Miller Center of Public Affairs at the University of Virginia
 David Apter - American political scientist and sociologist who was Henry J. Heinz Professor of Comparative Political and Social Development and Senior Research Scientist at Yale University
 Asher Arian - American and Israeli political scientist who was an expert on Politics of Israel and election studies
 Hadley Arkes - American political scientist and the Edward N. Ney Professor of Jurisprudence and American Institutions emeritus at Amherst College
 John Alexander Armstrong - Professor Emeritus of political science at the University of Wisconsin-Madison
 Larry Arnhart - Distinguished Research Professor Emeritus of Political Science at Northern Illinois University
 Richard Ashcraft - American political theorist and professor of political science at UCLA
 Herb Asher - professor emeritus of political science at Ohio State University
 Richard K. Ashley - postmodernist scholar of international relations
 Ronald Asmus - diplomat and political analyst and then senior think tank policy analyst
 Scott Atran - American-French political and cultural anthropologist
 Sharon Wright Austin - Director of the African-American Studies Program and a professor of political science at the University of Florida
 Deborah Avant - American political scientist at the University of Denver
 Bill Avery - politician from the state of Nebraska and retired political scientist who specializes in international trade and foreign relations
 Robert Axelrod - expert on game theory and complexity theory, wrote extensively on the Prisoner's Dilemma, former president of American Political Science Association
 Julia Azari - American political scientist, professor of political science at Marquette University and contributor to FiveThirtyEight
 Jeremy Azrael - American political scientist known for his expertise on the economy of the Soviet Union

B 
 Andrew Bacevich
 Gawdat Bahgat
 Kathleen Cordelia Bailey
 Fatih Baja - Gar Yunis University teacher and member of the National Transitional Council in charge of political affairs
 Susan Baker - Irish scholar of environmental governance in the European Union and ecofeminism, gender and the environment at Cardiff University
 Lisa Baldez
 Michel Balinski
 Moniz Bandeira - Brazilian writer, professor, political scientist, historian and poet
 Mary Jo Bane
 Edward C. Banfield
 Benjamin Barber - proponent of participatory democracy and local governance teaching at the University of Maryland School of Public Policy
 James David Barber - developed a classification system of the personality types of American presidents
 Stephen Barber - noted for his work on political strategy and political economy, author of Political Strategy
 Line Bareiro - Paraguayan political scientist, civil rights activist and feminist
 Joel Barkan
 Lucius Barker
 Michael Barkun
 A. Doak Barnett
 Michael Barnett - specialist in international relations
 Thomas P.M. Barnett - security strategist
 Simion Bărnuţiu - noted for his work on political strategy in Austria and Romania
 Bethany Barratt
 Matt A. Barreto
 David M. Barrett
 Larry Bartels - democracy and voting expert at Vanderbilt University
 Robert V. Bartlett
 Gad Barzilai - Law and Politics, Human Rights and Politics, Communities and Law at University of Washington
 Sylvia Bashevkin - Canadian scholar of women and politics
 Stephen Baskerville
 Amrita Basu
 Robert Bates
 Frank Baumgartner
 Phineas Baxandall
 David H. Bayley 
 Elmira Bayrasli
 Robert J. Beck
 Holmes Beckwith
 Francis Beer
 Samuel Beer
 Edward Beiser 
 Linda Royster Beito
 Charles Beitz
 Aaron Belkin
 Adolphus G. Belk Jr.
 Alon Ben-Meir
 Daniel Benjamin
 Mounia Bennani-Chraïbi - Moroccan political scientist, author and professor at the University of Lausanne
 Linda L. M. Bennett
 W. Lance Bennett
 William Benoit
 Myriam Benraad
 Richard Bensel
 Arthur F. Bentley
 Suzanne Berger
 Adam Berinsky
 Peter Berkowitz
 Ilan Berman
 Marshall Berman
 Sheri Berman
 Nancy Bermeo
 William D. Berry
 Michele Betsill
 Richard K. Betts - prize-winning author in a number of political science areas
 Mark Bevir - professor of political science and Director of the Center for British Studies at the University of California, Berkeley
 Seweryn Bialer
 Thomas J. Biersteker
 Leonard Binder
 Sarah Binder
 Thomas A. Birkland
 Sarah Birch - professor in comparative politics at King's College London
 Thomas A. Birkland - author of Lessons of Disaster
 Rachel Bitecofer
 Duncan Black - Spatial voting theorist
 Earl Black
 Merle Black
 Chris Blattman
 Hans T. Blokland - author of Freedom and Culture in Western Society and Modernization and its political consequences
 Jean Blondel - comparative politics at University of Siena, emeritus at European University Institute
 Lincoln P. Bloomfield
 Virgil Blum
 Mark Blyth
 Lawrence Bobo
 Alan Bock
 Sophie Body-Gendrot 
 B. Anthony Bogues
 Jean-Charles de Borda - 18th-century mathematician who devised the Borda count
 David Bositis
 Eileen Hunt Botting
 Catherine Boone
 Ammar Bouhouche - Algerian political and military leader and academic political scientist
 Terry Bouricius
 Donna Lee Bowen
 Shaun Bowler
 Janet M. Box-Steffensmeier
 Mark A. Boyer
 Jules Boykoff
 Paul Bracken
 David W. Brady
 Henry E. Brady
 Ralph Braibanti
 Steven Brams - expert on voting systems
 Laurie Brand
 Paul Brass
 Ahron Bregman - expert on the Arab–Israeli conflict
 Ian Bremmer - political risk specialist
 Janine Brodie - Distinguished University Professor and Canada Research Chair in Political Economy and Social Governance at the University of Alberta
 Stephen Brooks - international relations scholar
 Lara Brown - American political scientist and director of the Graduate School of Political Management at the George Washington University
 Nadia E. Brown - uses intersectionality to study identity politics, legislative studies, and Black women's studies
 Robert X. Browning - specialist in American politics and chief archivist for C-SPAN
 Zbigniew Brzezinski - Polish American political scientist, geostrategist, and statesman
 Bruce Bueno de Mesquita - pioneering game theorist with applications to international relations, author of selectorate theory
 Ralph Bunche - American political scientist and diplomat; received the 1950 Nobel Peace Prize for his late 1940s mediation in Palestine
 Walter Dean Burnham - expert in the field of realigning elections, emeritus at University of Texas at Austin
 David Butler - pioneer of modern British political science, invented the concept of swing

C 
William A. Callahan
 Melani Cammett - Clarence Dillon Professor of International Affairs and Director of the Weatherhead Center for International Affairs, Harvard University
 Linda Cardinal - University Professor and a Canada Research Chair in Canadian Francophonie and Public Policies at the University of Ottawa
 Ira Carmen - co-founder of the social science subdiscipline of genetics and politics
 Edward Hallett Carr - international relations theorist
 Alfredo Castillero Hoyos - democracy and human rights; former member of the United Nations's Human Rights Committee
 George Catlin (1896–1979) –  English political scientist and philosopher; strong proponent of Anglo-America cooperation; worked for many years as a professor at Cornell University
Jocelyne Cesari - French political scientist
 Pamela Chasek - international environmental policy expert
 Partha Chatterjee – Indian postcolonial critic, political and social scientist
 Rumman Chowdhury - Bengali-American political scientist and data scientist at Accenture
 Satyabrata Rai Chowdhuri - international relations, Indology at Institute of Commonwealth Studies
 Cathryn Clüver Ashbrook - Director and CEO of the German Council on Foreign Relations and co-founder and executive director of the Future of Diplomacy project, at Harvard University’s Belfer Center for Science and International Affairs.
John Coakley - specialist in ethnic conflict and Irish politics
 Benjamin Cohen - leader in the field of international political economy
 Elizabeth F. Cohen - American expert on citizenship and immigration
 Stephen P. Cohen - Middle East specialist
 James Smoot Coleman - early Africanist, founded the UCLA African Studies Center
 Marquis de Condorcet - 18th-century mathematician and philosopher who contributed the often used "Condorcet criterion" and devised the concept of a Condorcet method
 Ralph W. Conant - author of The Prospects for Revolution and Toward a More Perfect Union: The Governance of Metropolitan America
 Philip Converse - public opinion scholar, author of The Nature of Belief Systems in Mass Publics
 Timothy E. Cook - politics and media
 Clyde Coombs - voting systems expert, designed "Coombs' method"
 Morgan Lyon Cotti - professor, associate director of the Hinckley Institute of Politics
 Philip Cowley - author of Revolts and Rebellions
 Edvin Kanka Ćudić - Bosnian political scientist and human rights activist, founder and coordinator of UDIK in Bosnia and Herzegovina

D 
 Alison Dagnes - American specialist in politics and the media, politics and humor, and political scandal
 Robert A. Dahl - American politics specialist, author of On Democracy
 Jouke de Vries - Frisian politician and professor at the university of Leiden
 Vera Micheles Dean - Russian American political scientist, former head of research for the Foreign Policy Association, and leading international affairs authority in the 1940s and 1950s
Ronald Deibert - Canadian political scientist and founder and director of the Citizen Lab at the University of Toronto
 Fatima Denton - Ethiopian political scientist, Officer-in-Charge of the Special Initiatives Division and the Co-ordinator for the African Climate Policy Centre of the United Nations Economic Commission for Africa
 Daniel Deudney - writer and associate professor at Johns Hopkins University; author of Bounding Power:  Republican Security Theory from the Polis to the Global Village
 Karl Deutsch - political scientist, focused on political communication
 Larry Diamond - comparative democratization specialist; professor at Stanford University
 Thomas Diez - chair in International Relations at the University of Birmingham
 Michelle Dion - professor in the Department of Political Science and the Senator William McMaster Chair in Gender and Methodology at McMaster University
 John DiIulio - American politics expert at the University of Pennsylvania
 Ruth Dixon - winner of the Louis Brownlow Book Award of the National Academy of Public Administration and the W. J. M. Mackenzie award of the Political Studies Association.
 Charles Lutwidge Dodgson (also known as Lewis Carroll) - author of Alice in Wonderland and professor of mathematics at the University of Oxford; devised Dodgson's method of voting
 Robert Donaldson - professor at University of Tulsa and specialist in US/Russian foreign policy 
 Anthony Downs - contributed to democratic theory, elections studies
 Donald Downs - professor at University of Wisconsin; researcher for Independent Institute
 Michael W. Doyle - international relations theorist, author of Empires
 Daniel Drezner - professor at Tufts University, specializing in international politics
 Murray Dry - professor at Middlebury College, specializing in constitutional law
 John Dryzek - professor at the Australian National University, specializing in deliberative democracy and environmental politics
 John Dunn - political theorist at the University of Cambridge
 Maurice Duverger - French lawyer and sociologist responsible for Duverger's law
 Rand Dyck - Canadian politics expert and professor at Carleton University
 Thomas R. Dye - elite theory vs. pluralism; author of The Irony of Democracy and Who's Running America?

E 
 David Easton - originator of systemic theory
 Susan Eaton - American political scientist and workers' rights activist
 Daniel J. Elazar - American federalism and political culture scholar, founder of the Jerusalem Center for Public Affairs, political science professor at Bar Ilan (Israel) and Temple University
 Keisha Lynne Ellis - Bahamian political scientist
 Jean Bethke Elshtain - American political philosopher focusing on gender, ethics, American democracy, and international relations
 Jon Elster - Norwegian social and political theorist authored works in the philosophy of social science and rational choice theory and a notable proponent of Analytical Marxism
 Jadwiga Emilewicz - Polish politician, political scientist, and government minister
 Cynthia Enloe - international relations scholar focusing on Feminism in international relations, editor for such scholarly journals as Signs and the International Feminist Journal of Politics
 Eqbal Ahmed - Pakistani political scientist and Third World scholer

F 
 C. Christine Fair - American political scientist who studies counter-terrorism and South Asian topics
 James D. Fearon - American political scientist focusing on theory of civil wars, international bargaining, war's inefficiency puzzle and audience costs
 Peter D. Feaver - international security expert
 Dafydd Fell - British political scientist
 David Fellman - Constitutional scholar
 Richard Fenno - Congress scholar, author of Home Style: House Members in their Districts
 Thomas Ferguson - politics and economics
 Joel S. Fetzer - comparative politics specialist; distinguished professor at Pepperdine University
 Samuel Finer - academic and author on political science and history of government
 Norman Finkelstein - author on political science, notable for The Holocaust Industry
 Martha Finnemore - international relations and international organizations scholar
 Morris P. Fiorina - American politics; proposed retrospective vote theory
 Peter Fishburn - operations analysis and probability theory expert
 Keith Fitzgerald - immigration politics expert
 Naika Foroutan - German political scientist studying immigration and integration
 James H. Fowler - expert on political participation, the evolution of cooperation, and social network theory (UCSD)
 Daniel P. Franklin - American politics; politics of the presidency and Politics and Film
 Annette Baker Fox - international relations scholar
 William T. R. Fox - international relations theorist, coiner of the term "superpower"
 Ernst Fraenkel - German political scientist and one of the founding fathers of German political science after World War II
 Doris Fuchs (scientist) - German political scientist and Professor of International Relations and Sustainable Development at the University of Münster
 Francis Fukuyama - international political theory and biopolitics
 Archon Fung

G 
 Michael Gallagher
 Krenar Gashi - Ghent University political scientist and former Financial Times reporter
 Lisa García Bedolla - UC Berkeley professor, Vice Provost for Graduate Studies, and Dean of the Graduate Division 
 Scott Gates - specialist in international relations
 Barbara Geddes - scholar of authoritarianism and authoritarian regimes 
 Anthony Giddens - political sociologist originator of the Third Way
 Elisabeth Gidengil - Hiram Mills Professor of political science at McGill University studying political engagement and Canadian politics
 Robert Gilpin - international political economy specialist
 Benjamin Ginsberg – professor at Johns Hopkins University focusing on American politics
 Hannes Hólmsteinn Gissurarson - Professor of Political Science at the University of Iceland focusing on political theory
 Marianne Githens - political scientist, feminist, author, professor, and co-founder of the Women's Study Program at Goucher College
 Betty Glad - American researcher of the American presidency and American foreign policy
 Siri Gloppen - Norwegian political scientist
 Sheldon Goldman - expert on American federal courts; professor at the University of Massachusetts Amherst
 Grigorii Golosov - expert on political institutions and electoral systems, professor at European University at Saint Petersburg
 David F. Gordon - political risk specialist, former US Director of Policy Planning
 Harold Foote Gosnell - research and writings on American politics, elections, and political parties in political science
 Marie Gottschalk - American political scientist known for her work on mass incarceration in the United States
 Heather Grabbe - political scientist, activist, and director of the Open Society European Policy Institute in Brussels, Belgium
 Doris Graber - American pioneer in the field of political communication
 Colin Gray - international security
 Donald Green - Professor of Political Science at Columbia University focusing on field experiments in American politics
 Jane Green - professor of political science at the University of Manchester and co-director of the British Election Study who specialised in public opinion and electoral behaviour
 Liah Greenfeld - Israeli, American, and Russian social scientist
 Anna Grzymala - American political scientist, currently at Stanford University and previously also the Ronald Eileen Weiser Professor at University of Michigan
 Rhiana Gunn-Wright - American policy director
 Yaprak Gürsoy - Turkish political scientist and associate professor in the Department of International Relations at the Istanbul Bilgi University
 Ted Robert Gurr - specialist on conflict and violence
 Amy Gutmann - political theory expert; president of the University of Pennsylvania (2004–present)

H 
 Michael Haas – Emeritus Professor of Political Science, University of Hawai'i
 Jacob Hacker - Professor of Political Science at Yale University
 Henrike Hahn - German political scientist and politician who is a Member of the European Parliament
 Paul Y. Hammond - American foreign policy and national security specialist at University of Pittsburgh and elsewhere
 Harry Harding - China specialist
 Thomas Hare - devised single transferable vote (also known as Hare's method)
 Jeremy Harris - American politics specialist
 Michael Hart - British twentieth-century politics specialist
 Louis Hartz - American author of The Liberal Tradition in America
 Mary Hawkesworth - American political scientist and Distinguished Professor of Political Science and Women's and Gender Studies at Rutgers University
 Colin Hay - influential British political scientist
 Clarissa Rile Hayward - professor at Washington University in St. Louis studying the theory of political power and political identities
 Katharine Hayhoe - atmospheric scientist and professor of political science at Texas Tech University and director of the Climate Science Center
 Susan Hekman - professor of political science and director of the graduate humanities program at the University of Texas at Arlington (UTA)
 Marc Hetherington - author of Why Trust Matters; offered a new participation paradigm
 Christopher J. Hill - international relations scholar, Professor and Director of the Cambridge Centre of International Studies
 Roger Hilsman - aide to John F. Kennedy, Columbia University professor, and prolific author
 Nancy Hirschmann - Professor of Politics  at the University of Pennsylvania working in the intersection of political theory and public policy
 Sara Hobolt - Danish political scientist who specialises in European politics and electoral behaviour
 Thomas Holbrook - public opinion and elections research, author Do Campaigns Matter?
 Christopher Hood - author of The Art of the State and A Government that Worked Better and Cost Less?
 Donald L. Horowitz - pioneered political science models for assessing ethnic conflict
 Mala Htun - studies women's rights and the politics of race and ethnicity in a comparative context
 Evelyne Huber - studies democracy and redistribution with a focus on Latin America
 Mark Huddleston - former President of Ohio Wesleyan University and President of the University of New Hampshire
 Samuel P. Huntington - author of Clash of Civilizations and The Third Wave: Democratization in the Late Twentieth Century; comparativist

I 
 Kancha Ilaiah - Dalit scholar and social scientist
 Ronald Inglehart - professor at the University of Michigan; founder of the World Values Survey
 Shanto Iyengar - American political scientist

J 
 David J. Jackson - Entertainment/celebrity and politics expert
 Lawrence R. Jacobs - American political scientist and founder and director of the Center for the Study of Politics and Governance at the University of Minnesota
 Gary Jacobson - Constitutional law expert
 Ashley E. Jardina - American political scientist and assistant professor of political science at Duke University
 Hakeem Jefferson
 Attahiru Jega - Nigerian political scientists specialised in political development. former INEC chairman and also Former vice Chancellor of Bayero University. 
 Robert Jervis - international security specialist
 Chalmers Johnson - comparative theorist
 Jason A. Johnson - campaign management
 Loch K. Johnson - United States intelligence expert
 Charles O. Jones - specialist in American politics
 Bertrand de Jouvenel - French political scientist; co-founder of Mont Pelerin Society

K 
Kelly Kadera - professor at University of Iowa studying international relations, democratic backsliding, and gender in politics using dynamic models
Alice Kang - professor at University of Nebraska at Lincoln, expert in African politics and gender research
 Nazokat Kasimova - Uzbekistani political scientist, also noted for her work within the field of higher education reform
 Nina Kasniunas – author and the Arsht Professor in Ethics and Leadership at Goucher College
 Nancy Kassop - Professor at the State University of New York at New Paltz
 Peter Katzenstein – professor at Cornell, former president of the American Political Science Association
 Ira Katznelson – specialist in American and comparative politics
 Dennis Kavanagh
 Michael Keating – specialist in nationalism, European integration and regionalism
 Margaret Keck – developed the study of international activist movements and networked advocacy
 Edmond Keller – specialist in African politics
 Willmoore Kendall – political theorist; teacher of William F. Buckley, Jr.
 Robert O. Keohane – interdependence theory author
 Ben Kerkvliet – specialist in comparative politics
 Cornelius Kerwin – Former president of American University
 V.O. Key, Jr. – elections, parties and public opinion scholar
 Laleh Khalili - Iranian American and professor in Middle Eastern politics at the School of Oriental and African Studies
 Ilona Kickbusch - German political scientist best known for her contribution to health promotion and global health
 Gary King – professor at Harvard, political methodologist
 John W. Kingdon – specialist in American politics
 Grayson L. Kirk – specialist in international relations and President of Columbia University
 Henry Kissinger – former Secretary of State and National Security Advisor to President Richard M. Nixon
 Herbert Kitschelt – author on new radical right parties
 Stephen D. Krasner – international regimes author, Director of Policy Planning under Secretary of State Condoleezza Rice, and professor at Stanford University
 Michael Krassa – elections, social context, architecture and society; lobbyist, consultant, political sociologist at the University of Illinois at Urbana–Champaign
 Oskar Krejčí – theory of international relations, elections and political psychology, former advisor to two Czechoslovak premieres
 Sarah Kreps — foreign and defense policy, nuclear proliferation, and government transparency
 James Kurth
 Will Kymlicka – originated the theoretical foundations of multiculturalism

L 
 Guy Laforest – liberalism (John Locke) scholar; Quebec and Canadian politics specialist
 Celinda Lake - American survey methodologist, pollster, and political strategist
 Enid Lakeman - British political reformer, writer and politician, noted for her long-standing championship of the Single Transferable Vote system of elections
 Laura Langbein - American quantitative methodologist and professor of public administration and policy at American University
 Harold Lasswell – political communications, pioneered early efforts to establish the policy sciences and influential contributor to the Stages Heuristic
 Adria Lawrence - American political scientist and the Aronson Associate Professor of International Studies and Political Science at Johns Hopkins University
 Jack Layton – former leader of the New Democratic Party of Canada, Ph.D. in Political Science
 Richard Ned Lebow – constructivist, Cold War expert, author of Tragic Vision of Politics
 Michael Leifer – international relations, South Asian Studies, London School of Economics
 Noémi Lefebvre - French political scientist at the Instituts d'études politiques of Grenoble II
 Margaret Levi – scholar of comparative political economy, labor politics, democratic theory, former American Political Science Association president
 Carl Levy – Goldsmiths College, University of London
 Robert C. Lieberman – scholar of American politics and provost of Johns Hopkins University
 Arend Lijphart – originator of consociationalism
 Fernando Limongi - professor in the São Paulo School of Economics at the Fundação Getúlio Vargas
 Juan Linz – democracy specialist
 Dan Lipinski – U.S. House of Representatives (IL-D, 3rd)
 Seymour Martin Lipset – political theorist on democracy and development and parties; taught at Stanford University
 Leslie Lipson – was scholar of comparative politics and democracy at UC Berkeley
 Ramon Llull – discoverer of Condorcet Criterion and Borda Count
 Claudia López Hernández - Colombian political scientist and politician who was a Senator of the Republic of Colombia
 Theodore Lowi – major scholar of American politics at Cornell University
 Ian Lustick – state territoriality ethnic conflict and computer modelling in political science; University of Pennsylvania

M 
 Mizanur Rahman Shelley – was a minister of the Government of Bangladesh, political analyst, political scientist and educationalist.
 Niccolò Machiavelli – considered the originator of historically based political science; author of The Prince
 Beatriz Magaloni – political scientist at Stanford University
 Pia Mancini - political scientist, activist and technical project leader from Argentina
 Jane Mansbridge – scholar of social movements, gender, and democratic engagement (Harvard University), former American Political Science Association president
 Harvey C. Mansfield – political philosophy (Harvard University)
 Zeev Maoz – Arab-Israeli Conflict and international relations expert
 Jose M. Maravall – political economist
 Helen Margetts – Formerly Director of the Oxford Internet Institute and current Director of the Public Policy Programme at the Alan Turing Institute
 David Marsh – influential British political scientist
 Juraj Marusiak – Slovak expert for Central and Eastern Europe
 Joanna Marszałek-Kawa - Polish lawyer, political scientist, professor and lecturer at the Faculty of Political Science of Nicolaus Copernicus University in Toruń
 David R. Mayhew – U.S. legislative behavior and political parties expert
 Amy Mazur - American political scientist and professor at Washington State University
 John McCormick – specialist in European Union politics
 Tara McCormack - lecturer in international relations at the University of Leicester
 Rose McDermott - Professor of International Relations at Brown University 
 Michael McFaul – Russia specialist, professor and director of the Center on Democracy, Development, and the Rule of Law at Stanford University
 John McGarry – ethnic conflict specialist
 J. Patrice McSherry - professor of political science at Long Island University
 John Mearsheimer – international relations theorist and national security expert
 Samuel Merrill III – voting behavior and party competition
 George Michael – specialist in right-wing extremism
 David Miller – political philosopher, specialized in theories of social justice
 Charles Mills – political philosopher specialising in race relations; author of The Racial Contract
 Sara McLaughlin Mitchell - American political scientist and the  F. Wendell Miller Professor of Political Science at University of Iowa
 Terry M. Moe – specialist in American politics
 Malcolm Moos – former President of the University of Minnesota
 Andrew Moravcsik – professor at Princeton University, liberal IR theorist, specialist on European Union politics
 Hans Morgenthau – realist, international relations specialist
 James D. Morrow – international relations expert and game theorist
Rebecca Morton – expert in American Politics, Political Economy, and Experimental Methods; professor at New York University
 Gerardo L. Munck – comparative politics specialist, expert on democratization and Latin America
 Michael Munger – trained as an economist, chair of political science at Duke University, running for governor of North Carolina as a Libertarian
 Naomi Murakawa - American political scientist and associate professor of African-American studies at Princeton University
 Mohammed Barkindo - He is Nigerian political scientists and  petroleum economist. current secretary general of OPEC.
 Clark A. Murdock – Senior Adviser, Center for Strategic and International Studies
 Diana Mutz - Samuel A. Stouffer Professor of Political Science and Communication at the University of Pennsylvania and the director of the Institute for the Study of Citizens and Politics
 Harris Mylonas – Associate Professor of Political Science and International Affairs at George Washington University and editor-in-chief of Nationalities Papers

N 
 Brigitte L. Nacos - professor in political science at Columbia University
 Arthur Naftalin – specialist in American politics and former Mayor of Minneapolis, Minnesota
 Amrita Narlikar – President of the German Institute of Global and Area Studies and former Director of the University of Cambridge Centre for Rising Powers
 Antonio Negri
 Franz Leopold Neumann – known for analysis of National Socialism
 Kalypso Nicolaïdis - Professor of International Relations and Director of the Center for International Studies at Oxford University
 David Nolan – founder of the United States Libertarian Party
 Douglass North – Nobel laureate
 Pippa Norris – Harvard comparative political scientist
 Philip Norton – British politics expert
 Julie Novkov – American political scientist at SUNY Albany studying the history of American law, American political development, and subordinated identities
 Joseph Nye – "soft power" international security specialist; Kennedy School Dean

O 
Karen O'Conner - political science professor at American University in Washington, D.C. and the founder and director emerita of the Women & Politics Institute
Aloysius-Michaels Nnabugwu Okolie - professor at the University of Nigeria, Nsukka
 Guillermo O'Donnell – democracy specialist
 Brendan O'Leary – ethnic conflict specialist
 Cornelius O'Leary – Irish historian and political scientist
 Bertell Ollman – political theorist
 Mancur Olson – international political economy specialist; expert on collective action problems; taught at the University of Maryland, College Park
 A.F.K. Organski – developed power transition theory in his 1958 book World Politics
 Norman Ornstein - American political theorist; American Enterprise Institute (AEI) resident scholar
 Elinor Ostrom – specialist on common pool resources; winner of the 2009 Nobel Prize for Economics

P 
 Thomas Pangle – political theorist at University of Texas at Austin
 Michael Parenti – political scientist and author
 Vilfredo Pareto
 W. Robert Parks – former President of Iowa State University
 Gianfranco Pasquino – Italian political scientist; electoral systems, comparative politics
 Tiago C. Peixoto - Brazilian political scientist in e-democracy and participatory democracy
 Armand Peschard-Sverdrup - U.S.-Mexico binational relations expert
 Sergei M. Plekhanov – Russia relations expert
 Dianne Pinderhughes – scholar of race and gender inequality & public policy, former American Political Science Association president
 Nelson W. Polsby – American politics scholar
 Samuel L. Popkin – early expert on rational choice theory
 Karl Popper – theorist, originated the open society theory
 Emilia Justyna Powell - Polish-American political scientist known for her expertise on international dispute resolution, the Islamic legal tradition, Islamic international law, and Islamic constitutionalism
 Jewel Prestage – first African-American woman to earn a Ph.D. in political science, former Dean of the School of Public Policy and Urban Affairs at Southern University
 Adam Przeworski – Democratic transitions theorist, author of Democracy and Development; member of the September Group
 Robert D. Putnam – social capital theorist, author of Bowling Alone

R 
 Douglas W. Rae – equality theorist
 Vicky Randall - scholar of political science and gender
 Mahesh Rangarajan – Indian political analyst and researcher with a focus on contemporary Indian politics and the politics of wildlife conservation in India
 John Rawls – political philosopher
Gary D. Rawnsley FRSA— is a British political scientist whose research is located at the intersection of international relations and international communication.
 Dan Reiter – political scientist, specialized on military conflicts and war; professor at Emory University; author of How Wars End
 R. A. W. Rhodes – public administration scholar, pioneer of the study of policy networks in British government  
 Condoleezza Rice – former National Security Advisor; former Secretary of State; professor at Stanford University
 Floyd M. Riddick – Parliamentarian of the United States Senate from 1964 to 1974, and developer of Riddick's Senate procedure
 William H. Riker – 20th-century political scientist who applied game theory to political science
 Patrick T. Riley – political theorist and Kant scholar
 Pearl T. Robinson - American professor of political science at Tufts University 
 David Rohde – Congress scholar
 Stein Rokkan – expert on political parties and movements, founder of the Institute for Comparative Politics
 Richard Rose – American political scientist, Professor of Politics at the University of Aberdeen
 Richard Rosecrance – international relations and political economy expert
 Clinton Rossiter – American government and constitutional history theorist
 Susanne Hoeber Rudolph – scholar of political economy and political economy, former American Political Science Association president
 Irene S. Rubin – Emerita at Northern Illinois University focusing on interview methodology and public budgeting in American government
 John Ruggie – international relations theorist, social constructivist

S

 Larry Sabato – University of Virginia professor, director of the University of Virginia Center for Politics, and popular political analyst
 Scott Sagan – Stanford professor and notable critic of deterrence theory
 Slobodan Samardžić – research includes political ideas and institutions, federalism, constitutionalism, and European Union
 David Samuels – comparativist scholar of Brazilian politics and political institutions
 Eliz Sanasarian - professor of political science at the University of Southern California
 Virginia Sapiro - American political psychologist
 Austin Sarat – public law specialist
 Giovanni Sartori – comparativist, expert on constitutional theory and party systems
 E.E. Schattschneider – early political parties expert, author of Party Government and The Semisovereign People: A Realist's View of Democracy in America
 Steven Schier – specialist in American Politics
 Warner R. Schilling – specialist in international relations and military technology
 Kay Lehman Schlozman - J. Joseph Moakley Professor of political science at Boston College and an expert in American political participation and gender and politics
 Vivien A. Schmidt - Jean Monnet Chair of European Integration Professor of International Relations in the Pardee School of Global Studies and professor of political science at Boston University
 Cheryl Schonhardt-Bailey - professor in Political Science at the London School of Economics and Political Science
 Victoria Schuck - Professor of Political Science who spent much of her career (1940-1976) at Mount Holyoke College
 Ekaterina Schulmann - associate professor of the Russian Presidential Academy of National Economy and Public Administration and legal specialist
 Gesine Schwan – political scientist, president of the Viadrina European University, and nominated twice as a candidate for the federal presidential elections of Germany
 James C. Scott – political economist, Southeast Asia area specialist
 Hossein Seifzadeh – Iranian Professor of Political Science at University of Tehran; expert on strategic and security issues in the Middle East
 Mitchell A. Seligson – Centennial Professor of Political Science Vanderbilt University; founder of Latin American Public Opinion Project and AmericasBarometer
 Donna Shalala – former United States Secretary of Health and Human Services
 Jim Sidanius – American political scientist
 Matthew Soberg Shugart – scholar of constitutional design and electoral systems
 Yekaterina Shulman  – scholar specializing in lawmaking
 Beth Simmons – international relations scholar focusing on human rights
 Herbert A. Simon – Nobel Prize-winning professor at Carnegie Mellon; a founder of artificial intelligence research; received his Ph.D. in political science from the University of Chicago
 Valeria Sinclair-Chapman – studies American political institutions, the representation of minority groups in the United States Congress, and minority political participation
 Theda Skocpol – comparative sociologist; former president of American Political Science Association, Harvard University
 Stephen Skowronek – presidency and American political development scholar (Yale University)
 Anne-Marie Slaughter – scholar of international relations, former president of the American Society of International Law
 Jean Edward Smith – political economist, biographer, international relations, constitutional law
 Rogers Smith – Pulitzer Prize finalist, American politics expert at the University of Pennsylvania
 Steven S. Smith – American politics, congressional politics, Russian politics; Director, Weidenbaum Center
 Peverill Squire – Americanist
 Allison Stanger - American political scientist and the Russell J. Leng '60 Professor of International Politics and Economics at Middlebury College
 Michael Steed – British political scientist, developed the concept of "Steed swing" as distinct from "Butler swing"
 Alfred Stepan – comparativist, Wallace S. Sayre Professor of Government at Columbia University
 Zeev Sternhell – theorist, political historian of political ideology
 John G. Stoessinger – international relations theorist, author of The Might of Nations: World Politics in our Time
 Donald E. Stokes – former Dean of the Woodrow Wilson School at Princeton; expert on elections
 Susan Stokes - Tiffany and Margaret Blake Distinguished Service Professor in the Political Science department of the University of Chicago and the faculty director of the Chicago Center on Democracy
 Herbert Storing – American politics expert
 Susan Strange – British expert in international relations; taught at the London School of Economics
 Dara Strolovitch – studies the politics of race, class, gender, and sexuality in the context of intersectional societal inequality
 Carol Swain – Professor of Law and Political Science at Vanderbilt University; expert on immigration and race
 Stephen Szabo is an American political scientist and educator who specializes in foreign policy.
 Abdullahi Aliyu Sumaila a Nigerian political scientist, author of The Rise and Fall of Kano Peoples Party, Secretary-General People's Redemption Party 1980–1983, Campaign Manager of Nigerian People's Party -1983

T 
 Rein Taagepera – comparativist, expert on electoral systems and history of government
 Colin Talbot – Chair of Government at the University of Manchester; adviser to various Parliamentary Committees of the United Kingdom
 Marco Tarchi – professor at University of Florence, right-wing militant and creator of Nouvelle Droite
 Katherine Tate - Professor of Political Science at Brown University
 Merze Tate - international relations expert and first African-American woman to attend University of Oxford and receive a Ph.D. in government from Harvard University
 Sally Terry - political science professor at Tufts University from 1975 until her retirement in 2002
 Dennis Thompson – political theorist at Harvard University
 Marianne Thyrring
 J. Ann Tickner – feminist international relations theorist and current president of the International Studies Association (ISA)
 Virginia Tilley – specialist on the Israeli–Palestinian conflict
 Charles Tilly – professor at Columbia University, his work includes contentious politics and evolution of modern states
 Herbert Tingsten – professor of political science at Stockholm University
 Jeanne Theoharis - Distinguished Professor of Political Science at Brooklyn College.
 Reeta Chowdhari Tremblay - Canadian political scientist, former senior academic administrator, and an expert on Kashmir and India-Pakistan 
 George Tsebelis – game theorist notable for his general theory of veto players and for describing the Robinson Crusoe fallacy
 Tijjani Muhammad Bande - Nigerian political scientist permanent representative of Nigeria to the UN and former president of UNGA

U 

 Patrick Utomi - political economist

V 
 Stephen Van Evera – MIT international relations expert, known for proposing the Offense-Defense theory
 Tatu Vanhanen – democratization and ethnic nepotism
 Sarojini Varadappan - Indian social worker who earned her PhD at the age of 80
 Sidney Verba - American political scientist, librarian and library administrator
 Mieke Verloo - Professor of comparative politics and inequality issues at Radboud University
 Eric Voegelin – in his major work, Order and History in five volumes, he rejected the notion that political science should become a positivistic social science
 Margaret Vogt - Nigerian diplomat and political scientist who served as Special Representative and Head of the United Nations Integrated Peace-building Office in the Central African Republic
 Leah Vosko – professor at York University

W 
 Helen Wallace – international relations specialist
 Denise Walsh – studies the relationship between women's rights and political inclusion and level of democracy
 Stephen Walt – international relations specialist
 Kenneth N. Waltz – founder of the neorealist international relations school
 Michael Walzer – international relations, just war theory
 John Wanna – Sir John Bunting Chair of Public Administration at the Australia and New Zealand School of Government
 Georgina Waylen – comparative politics, political economy, and gender
 Linda Weiss - professor of political science at the University of Sydney
 Patricia A. Weitsman – international relations scholar, alliance theory
 S. Laurel Weldon - Canadian and American political scientist and Distinguished Professor of Political Science at Simon Fraser University
 Alexander Wendt – social constructivism proponent
 John Henry Whyte – specialist in Northern Irish politics
 Aaron Wildavsky – author of Risk and Culture
 Bruce A. Williams – specialist in American politics
 Danny Williams – Premier of Newfoundland and Labrador
 James Q. Wilson – former President of the American Political Science Association
 Woodrow Wilson – former Professor of Politics at Princeton University and former US President
 William Wohlforth – international relations scholar
 Arnold Wolfers – international relations scholar, classical realism
 Elisabeth Jean Wood – studies sexual violence during war, the emergence of political insurgencies and individuals' participation in them, and democratization
 Ngaire Woods – founding dean of the Blavatnik School of Government
 Susan L. Woodward – professor at the Graduate Center of the City University of New York

Y 
 Atilla Yayla – Professor of Politics, Political Economy and Political Philosophy at Gazi University in Turkey; president of the Association for Liberal Thinking
 Yelyzaveta Yasko - Ukrainian political scientist and politician who is a member of the Ukrainian Parliament
 M. Crawford Young – comparativist, Africa scholar

Z 
 Fareed Zakaria – international relations expert
 John Zaller – author of The Nature and Origins of Mass Opinion; at UCLA
 Elizabeth Zechmeister – comparativist at Vanderbilt University, Latin American politics and public opinion expert, Director of the Latin America Public Opinion Project (LAPOP)
 Zhang Weiwei - Chinese political scientist 
 Ina Zhupa - Albanian political scientist who studies Democratization and Values of Albanian Society

See also 
 Political theorist
 Oxford Handbooks of Political Science

References 

Political scientists
Political scientists